Mario Alford (born February 25, 1992) is an American gridiron football wide receiver for the Saskatchewan Roughriders of the Canadian Football League (CFL). He played college football at West Virginia.

Professional career

Cincinnati Bengals
Alford was drafted by the Cincinnati Bengals in the seventh round, 238th overall, in the 2015 NFL Draft. He played in one game his rookie year with the Bengals registering one catch for 15 yards. On September 3, 2016, he was released by the Bengals.

New York Jets
On November 16, 2016, Alford was signed to the Jets' practice squad. He was released by the team on December 6, 2016.

Cleveland Browns
Alford was signed to the Browns' practice squad on December 13, 2016. He was promoted to the active roster on December 17, 2016.

On September 1, 2017, Alford was waived by the Browns during roster cutdowns.

Chicago Bears
On September 12, 2017, Alford was signed to the Chicago Bears' practice squad.

Toronto Argonauts
On June 3, 2018, Alford signed with the Toronto Argonauts of the Canadian Football League. In his lone season in Toronto, Alford appeared in six games and caught seven passes for 57 yards, returned eight kick-offs for 170 yards, had five punt returns for seven yards, and rushed the ball once for 10 yards. He was released on May 25, 2019.

Montreal Alouettes
On September 24, 2019, it was announced that Alford had signed with the Montreal Alouettes. He was signed for the 2021 season on December 15, 2020. Over parts of three seasons, Alford played in nine games with the Alouettes where he had 24 kickoff returns for 477 yards, 26 punt returns for 486 yards and three touchdowns, and two missed field goal returns for 45 yards.

Saskatchewan Roughriders 
On July 3, 2022, Alford was traded to the Saskatchewan Roughriders in exchange for a sixth-round pick in the 2023 CFL Draft. He played in 13 regular season games for the team where he had 38 kickoff returns for 990 yards and two touchdowns, 44 punt returns for 530 yards and one touchdown, and three missed field goal returns for 129 yards and one touchdown. For his strong season, he was named the CFL's Most Outstanding Special Teams Player in 2022.

References

External links
Saskatchewan Roughriders bio
West Virginia Moutaineers bio

1992 births
Living people
People from Greenville, Georgia
Sportspeople from the Atlanta metropolitan area
Players of American football from Georgia (U.S. state)
African-American players of American football
American football wide receivers
West Virginia Mountaineers football players
Cincinnati Bengals players
New York Jets players
Cleveland Browns players
Chicago Bears players
African-American players of Canadian football
Canadian football wide receivers
Toronto Argonauts players
Montreal Alouettes players
21st-century African-American sportspeople
Saskatchewan Roughriders players